The IUP Crimson Hawks football program represents Indiana University of Pennsylvania in college football at the NCAA Division II level.  The Crimson Hawks play their home games at George P. Miller Stadium in Indiana, Pennsylvania.

The Crimson Hawks' current head coach is Paul Tortorella, who was named acting head coach for the 2017 season after Curt Cignetti resigned to take the head coach position at Elon University. Cignetti had been introduced as IUP's head coach on January 21, 2011, to replace Lou Tepper. Before coming to IUP, Cignetti served as an assistant at the Division I level for 28 years.

History
While little information is available, the Indiana Normal School played organized football games as early as 1890, when the school tied 6–6 with the Greensburg Athletic Association. Early on the school played other institutions such as Washington & Jefferson, West Virginia University and Western University of Pennsylvania, club teams such as the Greensburg Athletic Association and the Latrobe Athletic Association, the first professional football team. From 1895 to 1903, the Normal School played Latrobe six times, being outscored a total of 201–0, but playing one 0–0 tie. In 1892 they played against the Allegheny Athletic Association at Exposition Park in Pittsburgh, losing 20–6.

John Brallier became the first professional football player in 1895 after playing at the Normal School for two years. Born in Cherry Tree, Pennsylvania, Brallier played on the West Indiana Public School team. He began attending the Normal School in 1893 at age 17 so that he could play on the team. That year, the team won three of their four games. The team included Alex Stewart, father of actor Jimmy Stewart. In 1894, the team played other colleges and teams with former college players, winning only two of five games. The Normal School played Washington & Jefferson, losing 28–0. In December, Washington & Jefferson coach E. Gard Edwards wrote to Brallier, impressed by his play, encouraging him to attend the university. Brallier agreed if all his expenses were paid, and left the Normal team after graduating from public school in the spring.

University records begin with the tenure of George Miller in 1927. That first season, the Indiana State College team played other regional schools such as California State Normal School and Saint Vincent College, as well as further opponents such as Muskingum College and Kent State Normal College. Miller served for 20 seasons. His teams were twice honored as the best of the Pennsylvania state normal schools by sportswriters, in 1934 and 1940.

The Pennsylvania State Athletic Conference (PSAC) was formed by the members of the state system in 1951. Under future College Football Hall of Fame member Chuck Klausing, the team made their first appearances in the PSAC Championship game as the best team in the West Division. They lost both of their first two appearances, in 1964 and 1965. In 1968, the team competed against Delaware in the Boardwalk Bowl, which served as the NCAA College Division's eastern championship.

Frank Cignetti took over in 1986, and won the PSAC Championships that year, and again in 1987. In 1987, IUP made their first NCAA playoff appearance. Playing the UCF Golden Nights in the Citrus Bowl, which is a DI bowl game, and lost. The same year, they were awarded their first of ten Lambert Cups as the best Division II team in the east, second only to Delaware's twelve wins. Under Cignetti, IUP made two appearances in the NCAA Division II Championship in 1990 and 1993, losing both. When Cignetti retired in 2005, his 15 postseason appearances were the most among Division II coaches, his 182 wins at IUP more than doubled the next closest coach (George Miller, 79), and his 199 wins total (including 17 at West Virginia) were second-best for active Division II coaches.

Lou Tepper, who had previously coached at Illinois and Edinboro, took over in 2006. He became IUP's third coach, behind Bill Neal and Cignetti, that had served under Dave Hart at Pittsburgh. In the first season under Tepper, the Crimson Hawks won the PSAC West. In his first three-season, Tepper compiled a 25–7 record with the Crimson Hawks, but was 11–11 in his final two season and was dismissed as head coach following the 2010 season.

On January 21, 2011, former Alabama wide receivers coach and recruiting coordinator and son of longtime IUP head coach Frank Cignetti, Curt Cignetti accepted the head coaching job to replace Tepper.

Season records

Beginning in 1934, a group of sportswriters recognized the best team amongst Pennsylvania's State Teachers Colleges. When the Pennsylvania State Athletic Conference was organized in 1951 a point system was used to determine the champion until 1960. In 1960, the conference champion was determined by a championship game between the top teams of the East and West Divisions. In 1987 the championship game was discontinued, and only division champions were recognized from 1988 until the championship was reinstated in 2008.
References: Conference records and championships, season records, coaches records, and rankings.

Post-season appearances

NFL draft picks

Through the 2010 NFL Draft, seven Crimson Hawks players have been selected in the NFL Draft. The first selected was Dave Smith in 1970 by the Pittsburgh Steelers, while the highest-selected thus far was Jim Haslett, by the Buffalo Bills in 1979.

Notes
  Includes PSAC Championships from 1960–1987 and since 2008, a Boardwalk Bowl appearance in 1968, and Division II playoffs since 1987.
  From 1988 to 2007, the PSAC did not hold a championship game and only named Division champions.

References

External links